Falling for Christmas is a 2022 American Christmas romantic comedy film starring Lindsay Lohan as a spoiled heiress who loses her memory in a skiing accident and lands in the care of a lodge owner widower at Christmastime. The film is directed by Janeen Damian, in her directorial debut, from a screenplay by Jeff Bonnett and Ron Oliver. Chord Overstreet, George Young, Jack Wagner and Olivia Perez also appear in supporting roles.

It marked Lohan's first role in a major production in over a decade following a series of career setbacks while recovering from addiction and legal issues. Brad Krevoy and Michael Damian serve as producers on the film, which was first announced in May 2021. It began filming in Utah in early November 2021 and wrapped the following month. Lohan, her sister Aliana and Overstreet recorded songs for the project which were also featured in a soundtrack album.

The film was released on November 10, 2022, by Netflix, after a screening event for fans, hosted by the cast and crew, was held in New York City the day before. Falling for Christmas received generally mixed reviews from critics, who mostly found the story to be formulaic and clichéd but praised Lohan's acting return and on-screen presence. Rotten Tomatoes named it one of the best Christmas movies of all time. It had one of the best opening weekends for a Netflix original movie in 2022 on the streaming service.

Plot
Hotel heiress Sierra Belmont has been newly appointed as "vice president of atmosphere" at the luxury ski resort in Aspen owned by her father, Beauregard, despite having no interest in the business. While her father is away on business, Sierra goes up a mountain top with her influencer boyfriend Tad for a photo shoot where he proposes to her. However, the harsh wind causes Sierra, who was wearing skis, to lose balance. Sierra falls from the top of the mountain, is separated from Tad and hits her head on a tree. Unconscious, Sierra is found by Jake Russell, who she bumped into earlier just after his failed business pitch to her father, and is taken to a hospital. Sierra loses her memory due to the accident and the hospital staff is unable to verify her identify.

Jake offers the amnesiac Sierra a place at his bed and breakfast hotel, the Northstar Lodge, until she can remember who she is or someone comes to claim her. After taking the name Sarah from a stuffed toy that belongs to Jake's daughter Avy, Sierra decides to help him and his family at the lodge in hopes of getting her memory back, but struggles. However, Sierra bonds with Jake and his family, especially Avy, as she finds out that she lost her mother a couple years ago and feels sympathy for her, due to losing her own when she was younger and starts to trigger memories. After improving in helping the lodge, Sierra adjusts to a normal life. As the hotel is struggling, Sierra comes up with a party to raise funds for the hotel.

Meanwhile, Tad is lost in the woods and finds shelter with recluse Ralph, who takes him to town on foot. At the Belmont, the hotel staff don't think to look for Sierra and Tad as they believe that they are away on a trip. After four days, Beauregard returns from his trip where he finds out that Sierra is missing and informs the Sheriff, who has just retrieved Tad and Ralph. At the party, the town comes together to support the Northstar Lodge, which is declared a historic site. Before Jake can thank Sierra, Tad and her father rush in to take her home, restoring her memory. On Christmas Day, Sierra does her own chores, much to the staff and Tad's surprise.

Sierra decides she will do things for herself going forward and resigns from the position her father created for her realizing the hotel business is not for her. Meanwhile, Avy reveals to Jake that her wish was for him to find love and convinces him to seek out Sierra. Realizing that she fell in love with Jake, Sierra breaks off her engagement with Tad and, shortly after, Jake confesses his love to her. Sierra also decides to go back and help Jake run the Northstar Lodge, especially when she finds out that it is sold out for the season after she publicly thanked them at a press conference. Beauregard believes he owes Jake a debt of gratitude for finding Sierra and so decides to invest in the Northstar Lodge. They end with a very happy Christmas all together.

Cast
 Lindsay Lohan as Sierra Belmont / Sarah
 Chord Overstreet as Jake Russell
 George Young as Tad Fairchild
 Jack Wagner as Beauregard Belmont
 Olivia Perez as Avy Russell
 Alejandra Flores as Alejandra
 Sean J. Dillingham as Ralph
 Chase Ramsey as Terry Carver
 Aliana Lohan as Bianca
 Blythe Howard as Dr. Layla Monroe
 Lonzo Liggins as Mayor Anand
 Antonio D. Charity as Sheriff Borden
 Kate Rachesky as Heather
 Oscar Rudecindo as Darius

Production
In May 2021, Netflix announced that Lindsay Lohan would return to acting by starring in a Christmas romantic comedy for the streaming service and revealed its premise. The film's production details were reported by Variety, with Janeen Damian set to direct the screenplay written by Jeff Bonnett and Ron Oliver. Motion Picture Corporation of America's Brad Krevoy and Riviera Films' Michael Damian would be producing, while Amanda Phillips, Eric Jarboe and David Wulf served as executive producers. It was scheduled to start production in November, so it would be released for the 2022 holiday season. In October, Michael Damian confirmed in an interview that filming would begin the following month in Utah, elaborating on the project:

In early November, it was announced Chord Overstreet had been cast as Lohan's love interest in the film. George Young, Jack Wagner and Olivia Perez would also appear in undisclosed roles. In the following week, Netflix released a first look of the film, a publicity still featuring Lohan and Overstreet, which was still untitled. A production listing then reported principal photography for the film, under the working title Christmas in Wonderland, would take place in Utah, from November 8 to December 15, 2021. It was filmed in Park City and Salt Lake City. Overstreet was originally considered for the role of Tad Fairchild. Lohan improvised some of the comedy scenes and did some of her own stunts. Lohan was involved in her character's costuming. After the production, Lohan spoke about the importance of receiving a credit as executive producer: "It's a really different role that I get to play aside from just starring in the movie. It's being involved in the projects at every step: the whole casting process, the editing and production process. And even parts of the script." Writer Ron Oliver said:

Promotion
In February 2022, Netflix released its 2022 movie preview with a video teaser featuring footage from its most anticipated releases that included a clip of Lohan in the film, officially titled Falling for Christmas. That same month, Lohan talked to Vogue about her decision to join the film:

In July 2022, Lohan's mother Dina revealed her daughter Aliana would also be appearing in Falling for Christmas, as well as contributing with two songs. She had previously shared that both siblings would be singing in the film. On October 3, Netflix released the official poster and more information about the project, with Lohan describing her character Sierra as "Extravagant. Temperamental. Glamorous." On October 7, Netflix shared the movie's official trailer. After the release, the filmmakers talked about working with Lohan and the film's reception: "She's such an amazing actress and comedian and it was really fun working with her. She's really prepared and very professional and really enjoys her work. [...] it's just now coming to fruition and we're just now seeing how the world is embracing it. We will be very open to a sequel, that sounds like a lot of fun."

Music

The trailer for Falling for Christmas featured a cover version of "Jingle Bell Rock" recorded by Lohan for the film as a nod to her performance of the song in 2004's teen comedy Mean Girls. Netflix announced the full track would be available to stream on November 4, a week prior to the film's premiere. The full length version features a rap verse by Ali Tomineek, and a lyric video with footage from the film accompanied its digital release. A performance of "Everybody Loves Christmas" by Overstreet and a rendition of "Jingle Bells" by Aliana Lohan are also featured in the movie. On November 25, 2022, producer Michael Damian released his track "Must Be Christmas" recorded for the film. The soundtrack album, which includes the three original songs by Lindsay Lohan, Aliana Lohan and Chord Overstreet, along with the entire film score by Nathan Lanier, was released on November 11, 2022:

 "Jingle Bell Rock" (Lindsay Lohan featuring Ali Tomineek)
 "Everybody Loves Christmas" (Chord Overstreet)
 "Jingle Bells" (Aliana Lohan)
 Morning Entourage
 Belmont Stakes
 Brunch With Beau
 North Star Lodge
 Your Chariot Awaits
 Is This Thing Safe?
 Snowmobile
 Avy's Wish / Down the Mountain
 Jane Doe
 Where Am I?
 Raccoon vs. Granny Gown
 Cabin in the Woods
 Making Breakfast
 Missing
 Tangles & Bubbles
 Christmas Village
 Joy to the World / Making Memories
 Jake's Angel
 It's Not You...It's You
 Topping the Tree
 Find My Daughter
 The Dress
 Giving Back
 Christmas Morning
 The Wish Was for You
 Reservations
 A Christmas to Remember

Release
The film was released on November 10, 2022, on Netflix. The cast and crew attended a special fan screening premiere event on November 9 at the Paris Theater in Manhattan. It debuted at number one on Netflix's most watched movies list the day after its release. It had the fourth-biggest opening weekend for a Netflix original since May 2022 and the best start for an English-speaking film released on a Thursday on the streaming service. According to Whip Media's weekly ranker, it was the second most streamed movie overall in the United States in its debut tracking week (November 7–13), which only counted its first four days, and rose to number one in the following week. It also went on to become the top-streamed film globally on Netflix in its second week. It ranked on Nielsen's U.S. overall streaming ratings top 10 at ten, which covers series and film viewing on TV sets only, and third among movies after its first four days of availability. As of December 16, 2022, Falling for Christmas was the most-watched holiday movie released in 2022 by U.S. households that season, according to smart TV data collected by Samba TV.

A week after the release, Lohan reacted to the response the film received and thanked the crew and fans on social media: "I can't even begin to tell everyone how grateful I am for this incredible moment! To all of the fans and longtime believers in me, I appreciate you. My heart is filled with so much love and gratitude. Thank you Netflix for letting me bring this story to life with such a wonderful cast, director, producers and crew!" Falling for Christmas aired on Dutch television channel RTL 8 in prime time on December 19, 2022, becoming one of few Netlix original programming of its kind to have been broadcast on a TV channel.

Critical reception
 

Samantha Bergeson of the IndieWire stated the film features Lohan's "career-best work in years" and called it "the Citizen Kane of Netflix Christmas Movies", continuining that "Lohan absolutely owns the film, with Overstreet a worthy counterpart and a generous scene partner." In the Guardian, Benjamin Lee called the film "as bland and cloying as any other low-budget festive romance but serves as a strong reminder of [Lohan's] confident screen presence." Writing for Vanity Fair, Richard Lawson said Lohan "is back in bright form in the better-than-average Christmas B-movie film" that "is as dumbly winning as it's trying to be. In a more profound sense, it is heartening to see Lohan looking and acting well." David Roony of THR claimed that "if you're going to do an Overboard knockoff that slides into the generic sludge of sentimental holiday-season rom-com, then at least find a couple of leads with the charisma and chemistry to pull it off." Courtney Howard of Variety expressed that the film's "subversive spirit, female-forward smarts and sweet sentimentality remix the formulaic and festive, making all things merry and bright" and it is Lohan's "new, snappy and vibrant work that excels," describing her as "hilarious [...] yet also delicately faceted when melancholic moments arise."

The A.V. Club'''s Luke Thompson wrote that "it's silly, sitcom-y, and impossible to call "good," but Falling for Christmas is the kind of bad that feels almost appealing," calling Lohan the best part of the holiday rom-com that "occasionally charms" despite being predictable and formulaic. Ed Potton of the Times described it as an "aggressively unambitious blend of pantomime acting, knackered plotting and will-this-do? dialogue," with Lohan being "the least worst thing in it, showing the odd flicker of her old charisma." Writing for RogerEbert.com, Marya E. Gates called it a "tinsel-covered twist on Overboard", commenting "there is a warmth to this film that's hard to resist" and that "Lohan's irrepressible charm" holds it together. In Rolling Stone, K. Austin Collins also called it a formulaic film that "reminds audiences what made [Lohan] a movie star in the first place", writing, "This healthy dollop of Christmas camp [...] is eager to give Lohan something to do. That's the point, and that's what the movie pleasingly accomplishes." Sandra Gonzalez of CNN said: "Some actors shoot for Oscars, and that's great. Lohan's magic power has always been bringing to life films that have the simple goal of being unchallenging delights. If for that and that alone, Falling for Christmas is a gift." The Los Angeles Timess Noel Murray praised Lohan's performance, stating that she brings "every bit of her earthy charisma to a rare leading role" and "a spontaneous sincerity to even the corniest scenes. The movie's wrapping is shiny and plastic, but its star quality is genuine."

Accolades
In December 2022, Rotten Tomatoes ranked Falling for Christmas as the 90th best Christmas movie of all time. The Independent, TheWrap, Cosmopolitan, TV Guide, Seventeen, Den of Geek, Elle, Women's Health, CafeMom, the A.V. Club, Star Tribune, York Vision, Young Hollywood, Harper's Bazaar, Bloomberg, the New York Film Academy, The Herald, Radio Times, Marie Claire, Huffington Post UK, the New York Times and Vanity Fair'', among others, listed it as one of the best holiday movies of the season.

See also
 List of Christmas films

References

External links
 
 

2022 films
2022 directorial debut films
2022 romantic comedy films
2020s American films
2020s Christmas comedy films
2020s English-language films
American Christmas comedy films
American romantic comedy films
English-language Netflix original films
Films about amnesia
Films shot in Utah